Pierce Robinson Homer (born January 25, 1956) is a former Virginia Secretary of Transportation, serving from 2005 to 2010 under Governors Mark Warner and Tim Kaine. He was previously Deputy Secretary of Transportation from 2002 to 2005.

References

1956 births
Living people
State cabinet secretaries of Virginia
Virginia Democrats
Haverford College alumni
University of Texas at Austin alumni
People from Prince William County, Virginia